Riding Solo to the Top of the World is a 2006 documentary film in English language directed by Gaurav Jani on the Chang pas of Ladakh, in India, about a journey of self-discovery.

Plot

Riding Solo is a film about filmmaker Gaurav Jani's solo motorcycle journey from Mumbai to one of the remotest places in the world, the Changthang Plateau in Ladakh, bordering China.

External links 
 
 

2006 film awards
Indian documentary films
2006 documentary films
2006 films
Autobiographical documentary films
2000s English-language films
English-language Indian films